Akmonistion is an extinct genus of holocephalian that lived in the Early Carboniferous. The genus contains a single species, A. zangerli, discovered by Stan Wood in 1982. It is distinguished by an unusual enlarged formation of the dorsal fin, called a "spine-brush complex", of unknown function. This is also found in the better known genus Stethacanthus. Remains have only been found near Bearsden in Scotland. The genus name is derived from the Ancient Greek “akmon” (“anvil”) + “istion” (“sail”) referring to the appearance of its first dorsal fin. It reached  in length.

References

Carboniferous fish of Europe
Fossil taxa described in 2001
Symmoriiformes